Bylahalli is a village situated in Hassan district in Karnataka. It is around 19 km or 12 miles from Hassan. The very old famous Lord Sri Lakshmi Janardhana Swami temple is situated exactly in middle of the village.

See also
 Districts of Karnataka

References

External links
 ಹಾಸನ ಜಿಲ್ಲೆ , ಕರ್ನಾಟಕ ಸರ್ಕಾರ | ಬಡವನ ಊಟಿ | Hassan | India
 Bylahalli | Wayback Machine
 Sanjana Garudotsavam and Brahmotsavam at Sri Bylahalli Lakshmi Janardhana Swamy Temple.  - Anudinam.org
Sri rama seva samithi trast (R)

Villages in Hassan district